A Caixa is a 1994 Portuguese comedy film adapted from the play by Prista Monteiro by Manoel de Oliveira, who also directed the film. It was screened in competition at the 1994 Tokyo International Film Festival.

Plot
Stories of various individuals living in a poor district of Lisbon are intertwined with the sad life of a blind street vendor whose only means of support is his elm box.

Cast
 Luís Miguel Cintra as Blind Man 
 Glicínia Quartin as Old Woman 
 Ruy de Carvalho as Taverner 
 Beatriz Batarda as Daughter 
 Diogo Dória as Friend 
 Isabel Ruth as Saleswoman

References

External links
 

1994 films
French drama films
Portuguese drama films
1990s Portuguese-language films
1994 drama films
Films directed by Manoel de Oliveira
Films produced by Paulo Branco
1990s French films